IMI Fútbol Club was a Peruvian football club, playing in the city of Talara.

History
The club was 1998 Copa Perú champion, when defeated Coronel Bolognesi in the finals.

The club have played at the highest level of Peruvian football on one occasion, in the 1999 Torneo Descentralizado when was relegated.

Honours

National
Copa Perú: 1
Winners (1): 1998

Regional
Región I: 1
Winners (1): 1998

Liga Departamental de Piura: 1
Winners (2): 1996, 1998
Runner-up (2): 1997, 2001

Liga Distrital de Pariñas: 1
Winners (1): 1995

See also
List of football clubs in Peru
Peruvian football league system

 

Football clubs in Peru
Association football clubs established in 1992